The 330th Combat Training Squadron was a United States Air Force unit assigned to the 461st Air Control Wing based at Robins Air Force Base, Georgia.

Commanders of the 330th Combat Training Squadron
The commander of the 330th Combat Training Squadron is an Air Force position held by a lieutenant colonel. The 330 CTS is responsible for organizing, equipping, and ensuring the combat capability of all pipeline Airman on the E-8C
Joint Surveillance Target Attack Radar System, in a competitive and challenging training environment.

History

World War II
Established in early 1942 initially as a Consolidated B-24 Liberator reconnaissance squadron, flying antisubmarine patrols.  Later trained under Third Air Force in Florida.  Completed training in late 1942; deploying to European Theater of Operations as one of the initial heavy bomber squadrons assigned to VIII Bomber Command in England, September 1942.

Engaged in long-range strategic bombardment operations over Occupied Europe. Deployed to IX Bomber Command in Egypt in December 1942; operating from airfields in Libya and Tunisia.  Raided enemy military and industrial targets in Italy and in the southern Balkans, including the Nazi-controlled oilfields at Ploiești, Romania, receiving a Distinguished Unit Citation for its gallantry in that raid.  Also flew tactical bombing raids against Afrika Korps defensive positions in Tunisia; supporting British Eighth Army forces in their advance to Tunis, in September and October 1943.

Returned to England with disestablishment of IX Bomber Command in North Africa.  From England, resumed long-range strategic bombardment raids on Occupied Europe and Nazi Germany, attacking enemy military and industrial targets as part of the United States' air offensive.   The squadron was one of the most highly decorated units in the Eighth Air Force, continuing offensive attacks until the German capitulation in May 1945.

Returned to the United States in June 1945; being re-manned and re-equipped with Boeing B-29 Superfortress heavy bombers.  Trained for deployment to the Central Pacific Area to carry out very long range strategic bombing raids over Japan.  Japanese capitulation in August canceled plans for deployment, instead became Continental Air Command (later Strategic Air Command) B-29 squadron.

Cold War
During the Cold War, the squadron was equipped with new weapons systems as they became available, performing strategic bombardment training with the B-50 Superfortress, an advanced version of the B-29 in 1950. The B-50 gave the unit the capability to  carry heavy loads of conventional weapons faster and farther as well as being designed for atomic bomb missions if necessary.  By 1951, the emergence of the Soviet MiG-15 interceptor in the skies of North Korea signaled the end of the propeller-driven B-50 as a first-line strategic bomber.   Received Boeing B-47 Stratojet jet bombers in 1954, and in 1955 began receiving early model of the Boeing B-52 Stratofortress.  Inactivated in 1963 due to retirement of the B-52B and also budget restrictions.

Crew training
Reactivated in 1988 as the 330th Combat Flight Instructor Squadron.  The squadron received aircraft from the inactivating 320th Bombardment Wing at Mather Air Force Base. In 1992 after the de activation of SAC, the 330FTS aligned under the 398th Operations Group at Castle Air Force Base, California and continued training KC-135 crew members to become flight instructor.  The squadron inactivated in 1994 after the end of the Cold War and the reduction of the B-52 fleet.  Reactivated in 2002 at Robins Air Force Base as an advanced training unit for the E-8 Joint STARS aircraft.  Transferred to the Georgia Air National Guard when the Guard became the primary operator of the JSTARS.  Returned to the regular Air Force in 2011 as the 461st Air Control Wing assumed the JSTARS mission.

Lineage
 Constituted as the 330th Bombardment Squadron (Heavy) on 28 January 1942
 Activated on 1 March 1942
 Redesignated 330th Bombardment Squadron, Heavy on 20 August 1943
 Redesignated 330th Bombardment Squadron, Very Heavy on 23 May 1945
 Redesignated 330th Bombardment Squadron, Medium on 28 May 1948
 Redesignated 330th Bombardment Squadron, Heavy on 1 February 1955
 Inactivated on 15 September 1963
 Redesignated as 330th Combat Flight Instructor Squadron on 5 August 1988
 Activated on 24 August 1988.
 Redesignated as 330th Flying Training Squadron on 1 June 1992
 Inactivated on 20 January 1994
 Redesignated as 330th Combat Training Squadron on 28 June 2002
 Activated on 13 August 2002
 Allotted to the National Guard Bureau on 1 October 2002
 Relieved from allotment to the National Guard Bureau on 1 October 2011

Assignments
 93d Bombardment Group, 1 March 1942 (attached to 93d Bombardment Wing after 10 February 1951)
 93d Bombardment Wing, 16 June 1952 – 15 September 1963
 93d Bombardment Wing, 24 August 1988 – 1 September 1991
 398th Operations Group, 1 June 1992 – 20 January 1994
 93d Operations Group, 13 August 2002
 116th Air Control Wing, 1 October 2002
 461st Operations Group, 1 October 2011 – present

Stations

 Barksdale Field, Louisiana, 1 March 1942
 Page Field, Florida, 18 May-13 August 1942
 RAF Alconbury (AAF-102), England, 7 September 1942
 RAF Hardwick (AAF-104), England, c. 6 December 1942 – 15 June 1945
 Air echelon operated from Tafaraoui Airfield, Algeria, 7–15 December 1942; RAF Gambut, Libya, 16 December 1942 – 25 February 1943; Benghazi Airport, Libya, 27 June-26 August 1943; Oudna Airfield, Tunisia, 18 September-3 October 1943

 Sioux Falls Army Air Field, South Dakota, 26 June–26 July 1945
 Pratt Army Air Field, Kansas, 20 August 1945
 Clovis Army Air Field, New Mexico, 13 December 1945
 Castle Field (later Castle Air Force Base), California, 21 June 1946 – 15 September 1963
 Castle Air Force Base, California, 24 August 1988 – 20 January 1994
 Robins Air Force Base, Georgia, 13 August 2002 – present

Aircraft

 Consolidated B-24 Liberator, 1942–1945
 Boeing B-29 Superfortress, 1945–1949
 Boeing B-50 Superfortress, 1949–1954
 Boeing B-47 Stratojet, 1954–1955
 Boeing B-52 Stratofortress, 1955–1963, 1988–1992
 Boeing KC-135 Stratotanker, 1988-1993
 Boeing E-8 Joint STARS, 2002–present

See also

 List of B-52 Units of the United States Air Force

References

 Notes

Bibliography

External links
 The 93rd Bombardment Group Museum, Station 104, Hardwick.  A small museum on the actual airfield site in Nissen (Quonset) and brick built huts.

Training squadrons of the United States Air Force
Military units and formations in California
Military units and formations established in 1942